George Cardinal Joseph Hall (born 15 July 2004) is an English professional footballer who plays as a midfielder for  club Birmingham City. Hall has represented England at under-18 and  under-19 levels.

Early life and career
Hall was born in Redditch, Worcestershire, where he lived in the Walkwood district and attended Astwood Bank First School and St Bede's Catholic Middle School. He helped their Year 8 football team reach the final of the ESFA Under-13 Schools' Cup, and scored the second goal of their 2–0 win in the final. He joined Birmingham City's academy from Headless Cross under-8s in 2012, and took up a two-year scholarship with the club in July 2020. According to the then head of professional development phase, Mike Dodds, "He was a very versatile player in the younger age groups before holding down a regular position in the centre of midfield in his Under-16 season. Athletic and box-to-box, he has started to show good signs of progression both technically and tactically."

Club career
In 2020–21 Hall was a member of Birmingham's under-18 team that finished as runners-up in the Northern Section of their league, and came from behind against Charlton Athletic's U18 in the national semi-finals only to lose to a last-minute goal. As well as playing for the under-18s, he started several matches for Birmingham's under-23 team in the 2021–22 Premier League 2. Amid reported interest from Premier League clubs including Brighton & Hove Albion, Leeds United, Newcastle United and Southampton, Birmingham did not want to risk losing Hall the same way that they lost Amari Miller to Leeds. Hall signed his first professional contract with Birmingham on 24 November 2021. Under-18s coach Martyn Olorenshaw described him as "an attacking midfielder with an ability to create and score goals [who] is explosive, dynamic and has the prowess to influence games."

He was an unused substitute for Birmingham's Championship visit to Millwall on 4 December, and he made his senior debut on 2 January 2022, starting alongside fellow 17-year-old Jordan James in support of Troy Deeney at home to Queens Park Rangers. He played 84 minutes before being replaced by Scott Hogan as Birmingham tried and failed to come back from 2–1 down. He scored his first senior goal on 16 August 2022, opening the scoring in a 1–1 draw at home to Watford in the Championship.

International career
Hall received his first call-up to the England under-18 squad in November 2021. He played in all three of England's matches in the Pinatar Tournament in Spain, starting in a loss to the Netherlands and a win against Portugal and coming on in a goalless draw with Belgium, and made two more appearances in March 2022. Hall scored his first international goal during a 3–2 victory over Austria in Croatia on 7 June 2022. 

After eight appearances for the under-18s, he was included in the England under-19 squad for three Euro qualifiers to be played in Denmark. He made his under-19 debut on 21 September 2022, starting in a 2–0 win over Montenegro.

Career statistics

References

2004 births
Living people
Sportspeople from Redditch
Footballers from Worcestershire
English footballers
England youth international footballers
Association football midfielders
Birmingham City F.C. players
English Football League players